The 2016–17 Al-Taawoun season was the club's 61st season in existence and its 9th (non-consecutive) season in the top tier of Saudi Arabian football. This season, Al-Taawoun participated in the Pro League for the seventh consecutive season as well as the King Cup and Crown Prince Cup. The season covered the period from 1 July 2016 to 30 June 2017. The club also entered the 2017 AFC Champions League at the group stage.

Pre-season friendlies

Players

First team squad

This section lists players who were in Al-Taawoun's first team squad at any point during the 2016–17 season
Asterisks indicates player left mid-season
Hash symbol indicates player retired mid-season
Italics indicate loan player

Transfers

Transfers in

Transfers out

Loans in

Loans out

Competitions

Overall

Last Updated: 13 May 2017

Pro League

League table

Results summary

Results by round

Matches
All times are local, AST (UTC+3).

Crown Prince Cup

All times are local, AST (UTC+3).

King Cup

AFC Champions League

Al-Taawoun qualified for the Group Stage of the 2016–17 AFC Champions League by finishing fourth in the 2015–16 Saudi Professional League. It is their first participation in this competition.

Group stage

Statistics

Squad statistics
As of 13 May 2017.

|}

Goalscorers

Last Updated: 13 May 2017

Clean sheets

Last Updated: 20 April 2017

References

Al-Taawoun FC seasons
Taawoun